Phymaturus bibronii is a species of lizard in the family Liolaemidae. It is from Chile.

References

bibronii
Lizards of South America
Reptiles of Chile
Endemic fauna of Chile
Reptiles described in 1848
Taxa named by Alphonse Guichenot